De Niro's Game is the debut novel by Lebanese-Canadian writer Rawi Hage, originally published in 2006.

The novel's primary characters are Bassam and George, lifelong friends living in war-torn Beirut. The novel traces the different paths that the two follow as they face the difficult choice of whether to stay in Beirut and get involved in organized crime, or to leave Lebanon and build a new life in another country.

Awards
In addition to the awards listed below, Sophie Voillot's translation of De Niro's Game was shortlisted for the 2008 Cole Foundation Prize for Translation.

References

2006 Canadian novels
Novels by Rawi Hage
Novels set in Lebanon
2006 debut novels